The Evangelical Review of Society and Politics was a peer-reviewed, scholarly theological journal published by the King's Evangelical Divinity School, England. It was published biannually in both print and electronic formats. The journal defined its scope as "scholarly evangelical analysis of contemporary social and political issues".

It has subsequently been replaced by a similar journal in electronic form only Evangelical Review of Theology and Politics and published by the same source.

External links 
 Midlands Bible College blog where many issues relevant to the journal are posted.

Publications established in 2006
Protestant studies journals
Protestantism and politics
Sociology of religion
Evangelical magazines